A partial solar eclipse occurred on July 21, 1906. A solar eclipse occurs when the Moon passes between Earth and the Sun, thereby totally or partly obscuring the image of the Sun for a viewer on Earth. A partial solar eclipse occurs in the polar regions of the Earth when the center of the Moon's shadow misses the Earth.

Related eclipses

Solar eclipses 1906–1909

Metonic series

References

External links 

1906 7 21
1906 7 21
1906 in science
July 1906 events